Terence Cotton (born 25 January 1946) is a former amateur footballer who played as a centre half, notably in the Southern League with Yeovil Town, for whom he made 415 appearances. He also played in the Football League for Swansea City. Born in England, he was capped by Wales at amateur level. After retiring as a player, Cotton served Yeovil Town as youth team manager, assistant manager and in hospitality.

Personal life 
Upon joining Yeovil Town in 1971, Cotton worked for Normalair. His wife Jean worked as a secretary at Yeovil Town for more than 30 years, before retiring in 2020. As of 2003, Cotton was a skittles player.

Honours 
Swansea City
 Football League Fourth Division third-place promotion: 1969–70

Individual
 Yeovil Town Player of the Year: 1972–73, 1975–76

References 

Welsh footballers
English Football League players
Wales amateur international footballers
Association football wing halves
1946 births
Footballers from Swansea
Living people
Swansea City A.F.C. players
Yeovil Town F.C. players
Salisbury City F.C. players
Southern Football League players
Yeovil Town F.C. non-playing staff
Llanelli Town A.F.C. players
Association football forwards
Taunton Town F.C. players
Bridport F.C. players